Hector Macdonald may refer to:

 Hector Macdonald (judge) (1915–2011), Rhodesian judge
 Hector Munro Macdonald (1865–1935), Scottish mathematician
 Hector MacDonald (1853–1903), British Army general